Bruno Bruni senior (born 22 November 1935, in Gradara, Italy) is an Italian lithographer, graphic artist, painter and sculptor. He became commercially successful in the 1970s. In 1977, he won the International Senefeld award for Lithography. He has since become one of the most successful Italian artists in Germany and one of Germany's best known lithographers.

Biography
Born in Gradara, in the Province of Pesaro and Urbino on the Adriatic Coast in 1935, the son of a railway attendant, Bruni started painting as a young boy. He was initially a pupil of Giuliano Vanghi [1]; from 1953 to 1959 he attended the Art Institute in Pesaro. He then moved to London, where he became interested in pop art. In 1960, after an exhibit of his work at London's John Whibley Gallery, and after meeting a girl from Hamburg, he moved there to live with her and enrolled at the Hochschule für bildende Künste Hamburg. He has lived in the city ever since and visits his hometown regularly.

In the 1970s, Bruno Bruni made a name for himself as a draftsman, lithographer, painter and sculptor in the international art world. In 1977, he won the International Senefeld Competition for Lithography. He is influenced primarily by German expressionists like Otto Dix, George Grosz etc. and the Italian old masters . In particular, he is noted as one of the few lithographic artists "who paint all work directly onto the stone". He is especially known for his erotic female forms. He has said, "I cannot paint an abstract picture. If I had gone along with the trends I'd have disappeared long ago". He resides in a converted swimming pool, more than a century old, which serves as apartment, workplace and gallery. He sells his art through his wife's gallery in Hanover and is reputedly one of Germany's top earning artists. He is also a keen cook of Italian cuisine, and is a boxing fan and a close friend of former boxing champion Dariusz Michalczewski, for whom he used to cook for before matches. He has also cooked for Gerhard Schröder and has published a cooking book with his favourite recipes, memoirs and pictures related to his life.

Selected works

Drawings and paintings 
 Der gelbe Stern (1961) pen
 Kleines Veilchen (1961) pencil and gouache
 Con bicchiere (1963) pencil on grey paper
 stop (1963) gouache

Graphic art 
 Manfred (1961) drypoint
 Donna-fiore (1965) lithography
 Knospe I (1966) lithography
 Metamorphosis (1970) lithography in four colours
  Onda (1973) lithography in three colours
 Amanti (1978) lithography in seven colours
 Figure e fiori (1980) sequence of five lithographies
 Nicht sehen, nicht reden, nicht hören (1979) lithography in five colours

Bronze Sculptures 
 Der Kuss sculpture (1960) Bronze
 La sorella (1962) Bronze
 Europa und der Stier Bronze
 Il Ritorno (1980) Bronze
 La venere sdraiata (1982) Bronze
 Candelieri da Pergola(1991) Bronze

Bibliography
 Volker Huber: Bruno Bruni - Farblithographien. Edition Volker Huber, Offenbach am Main 1989. 
 Bruno Bruni - Neue Arbeiten 1977 bis 1982. Athenäum Verlag, Königstein/Ts. 1982. 
 Bruno Bruni: Gaumenfreuden und Kunstgenuss. Meine Art zu leben. Walter Hädecke Verlag, Weil der Stadt 2005.

References

External links

Vanessa Seifert: Maler Bruno Bruni: Ein Leben zwischen Italien und Hamburg Hamburger Abendblatt 22 November 2010 

Italian lithographers
1935 births
Living people
People from the Province of Pesaro and Urbino
Italian expatriates in Germany
German lithographers
German contemporary artists
University of Fine Arts of Hamburg alumni